Jason Flowers (born August 10, 1979) is an American basketball coach who is currently the director of player development for the women's basketball team at California Baptist University. Prior to Cal Baptist, he was the head women's basketball coach at Cal State Northridge from 2010 to 2020, where he was a two-time Big West Conference Coach of the Year as well as winning three Big West Conference tournament titles.

A former guard at UC Irvine and UCLA, Flowers is married to Tairia Flowers, a former Olympic gold medalist in softball who is currently the head softball coach at Loyola Marymount. They have three children, two daughters and a son.

Head coaching record

References

External links 
 
 Cal Baptist Lancers profile
 Cal State Northridge Matadors profile

1979 births
Living people
Basketball players from Long Beach, California
Basketball coaches from California
Guards (basketball)
UC Irvine Anteaters men's basketball players
UCLA Bruins men's basketball players
UCLA Bruins men's basketball coaches
High school basketball coaches in California
Long Beach State Beach women's basketball coaches
UC Riverside Highlanders women's basketball coaches
Cal State Northridge Matadors women's basketball coaches
California Baptist Lancers women's basketball coaches